Mariënberg is a railway station located in Mariënberg, Netherlands. The station was opened on 1 February 1905 and is located on the Zwolle–Emmen railway and the Mariënberg–Almelo railway. The services are operated by Arriva.

Train services

Platforms

 Zwolle
 Emmen
 Almelo

Bus services

External links

NS website 
Dutch Public Transport journey planner 

Railway stations in Overijssel
Railway stations opened in 1905
Railway stations on the Emmerlijn
Hardenberg
1905 establishments in the Netherlands
Railway stations in the Netherlands opened in the 20th century